Jeremy Ayers (1948 – October 24, 2016) was an American artist, writer, photographer, and musician. Ayers was a member of the Athens, Georgia, creative community, published three books of photography, and co-wrote songs for The B-52's and R.E.M. In 2021, a newly discovered species of ant (Strumigenys ayersthey) was named in his honor.

Life and death 

Born Charles Jeremy Ayers, he grew up in Athens, Georgia where his father Robert H. Ayers taught theology at the University of Georgia. He became involved (as "Sylva Thinn") with Andy Warhol's Factory in the 1970s. Ayers wrote for Interview and published three books of photography (Aeronautica, 2011; Today in New York, 2011; and Occupy!, 2012), which featured scenes from Athens, New York City street life, and Occupy Wall Street.

Ayers was credited as co-writer of "52 Girls" from the debut album of The B-52's. He also worked with fellow Athens musicians R.E.M., co-writing the song "Old Man Kensey" from the 1985 album Fables of the Reconstruction.

His father Robert was a civil rights advocate and professor of religion at the University of Georgia.

On October 24, 2016, Ayers died unexpectedly of a seizure at the age of 68.

Legacy 

Following his death, the Athens Institute for Contemporary Art presented a month-long exhibition featuring Ayers's work titled "Out There: Photographs in the spirit of Jeremy Ayers." In addition to photographs taken by Ayers, the exhibit included photography done by other artists taken "in the same spirit" of his work.

In 2017 Ayers's friend Michael Stipe presented an art installation in his honor at Moogfest in Durham, North Carolina. The installation, titled "Jeremy Dance," featured footage of Ayers dancing to a 120 beats per minute disco song; Stipe then paired the dancing footage with music specially composed (using a Moog synthesizer and a Roland Juno) to match Ayers's movements.

In 2021 German entomologist Phillip Hoenle discovered a new species of ant, which he sent to Yale University taxonomic expert Douglas Booher. After receiving the blessing of Stipe, Booher decided to name the ant Strumigenys ayersthey after Ayers. The "they" in ayersthey refers to the singular they "in a celebration of gender diversity." According to Booher, Ayers himself identified as a gay man; the "they" suffix was intended to honor both Ayers's LGBT activism and the non-binary community.

References

External links 
 Jeremy Ayers Tumblr (archived)

1948 births
2016 deaths
American gay writers
American gay musicians
American gay artists
American LGBT photographers
Gay photographers